Lebuh Ayer Keroh, Federal Route 143, also known as Lebuhraya Ayer Keroh or Ayer Keroh Avenue, is the main dual-carriageway highway that connects Malacca City of Malacca, Malaysia to the North–South Expressway via Ayer Keroh Interchange. Ayer Keroh, the main satellite town of Malacca City is located along the road. Lebuh Ayer Keroh used to be Melaka State Route M31 before being recommissioned by Malaysian Public Works Department (Jabatan Kerja Raya (JKR)). Before 1993, most of the road was a two-lane road before it was upgraded to a dual-carriageway in 1993 (Ayer Keroh Toll Plaza–Graha Makmur) and in 1997 (entire route).

The Kilometre Zero of the Federal Route 143 starts at Jalan Durian Tunggal junctions near Ayer Keroh toll plaza of the Ayer Keroh Interchange.

Features
 Ayer Keroh Gateway Arch
 Ayer Keroh
 Hang Tuah Jaya

At most sections, the Federal Route 143 was built under the JKR R5 road standard, with a speed limit of 90 km/h.

List of junctions and interchanges

References

Ayer Keroh
Highways in Malaysia
145
Roads in Malacca